The FIA WTCR Race of Germany, previously known as the FIA WTCC Race of Germany, is a round of the World Touring Car Cup, which originally was held at the Motorsport Arena Oschersleben in Germany.

The race ran at Oschersleben every year since the return of World Touring Car Championship from 2005 to 2011. It was left off the 2012 calendar. The event returned to the calendar in 2015, this time hosted at the Nürburgring Nordschleife as part of the 24 Hours Nürburgring weekend. The races are three laps each.

Winners

Gallery

References

Germany
Germany
World Touring Car Cup